WXRH (580 AM) is a radio station licensed to Rockwood, Tennessee, United States. The station is currently owned by 3B Properties, through licensee 3B Tennessee, Inc.

On February 3, 2020, WXRH changed its format to classic country, branded as "93.3 The Ranch".

References

External links

Classic country radio stations in the United States
XRH
Roane County, Tennessee